Regina Narva (née Rõtova; born 19 May 1970) is an Estonian chess Woman FIDE Master (2007).

Biography
Narva was born in Tallinn, the daughter of Estonian chess players Boris Rõtov (1937–1987) and Merike Rõtova (1936– ).

In the Estonian Women's Chess Championship, Regina Narva has won gold (2011), silver (1989) and 5 bronze medals (1987, 2007, 2010, 2013, 2014). In 2013, she won the Estonian Rapid Chess Championship.

Regina Narva played for Estonia in three Chess Olympiads:
 In 2012, at reserve board in the 40th Chess Olympiad in Istanbul (+3 −2 =2);
 In 2014, at reserve board in the 41st Chess Olympiad in Tromsø (+1 −1 =2);
 In 2016, at reserve board in the 42nd Chess Olympiad in Baku (+2 −2 =1).

Regina Narva played for Estonia in the European Team Chess Championship:
 In 2007, at third board in Heraklion (+0 −1 =7).

Family
Her husband Jaan Narva (1958–) is a FIDE master (2004). They have two chess-playing daughters Triin Narva (1994–) and Mai Narva (1999–). In 2014 and 2016 Mai Narva won the Estonian Women's Chess Championship and she is European U16 Girls Champion 2014. In the 2014 Chess Olympiad in Tromsø, Norway, all three played for the Estonian Women's team: Mai board 1, Triin Board 3, and Regina Board 5 (first reserve). Her brother Igor Rõtov is head editor in newspaper Äripäev.

References

External links
 
 
 

1970 births
Living people
Estonian female chess players
Soviet female chess players
Chess Woman FIDE Masters
Sportspeople from Tallinn
Estonian people of Russian descent